Atra or ATRA may refer to:

Places 
 Atra, Estonia
 Hatra, an ancient city in modern-day Iraq

Other uses 
 Advanced Transit Association
 All-trans retinoic acid, or tretinoin, a medication
 American Taxpayer Relief Act of 2012
 American Tort Reform Association
 Atra razor, produced by the Global Gillette company